Jim Courier defeated Wayne Ferreira in the final, 6–3, 6–3, 6–1 to win the men's singles tennis title at the 1993 Indian Wells Masters.

Michael Chang was the defending champion, but lost to Courier in the semifinals.

Seeds
The top eight seeds receive a bye into the second round.

Draw

Finals

Section 1

Section 2

Section 3

Section 4

Qualifying

Qualifying seeds

Qualifiers

Lucky loser
  Diego Pérez

Qualifying draw

First qualifier

Second qualifier

Third qualifier

Fourth qualifier

Fifth qualifier

Sixth qualifier

Seventh qualifier

References

External links
 Official results archive (ATP)
 Official results archive (ITF)

N